April Rose (Haydock) (born November 3, 1987) is an American model, and actress. After being voted Maxims "Hometown Hotties" winner in 2008, she has been featured in magazines such as Maxim Canada as the cover girl, and has also appeared as herself in television shows such as Guy Code, Girl Code, Chicago Faceoff with April Rose, and Chicago Huddle. She has also appeared in various feature films such as Grown Ups 2 and appeared on the Speed channel as a co-host for Barrett-Jackson Auto Auction.

Early life 
Haydock acquired an emergency medical technician certification from Oakton Community College and a cardiovascular technologist license from PCCTI in Chicago. She was also certified as a medical crisis counselor for Rape Victim Advocates (RVA).

Acting 

From 2011 to 2014 April Rose wrote and hosted MAXIM weekly web series. She is an original cast member of MTV2 series Guy Code and its sister spinoff MTV's Girl Code. She hosted MTV Spring Break 2014 from Cancun, Mexico alongside Guy Code castmate Andrew Schultz. She was cast as Kasey Knox 'Hot Dance Teacher' in the feature film Grown Ups 2, where she plays a Russian dance instructor and girlfriend of Tommy Cavanaugh played by Stone Cold Steve Austin. She became an on-air contributor for Speed live coverage of the Barrett-Jackson Auction in 2011. She stayed with them as they transitioned to Fox Sports Networks. She has been an on-air contributor for Comcast SportsNet Chicago since 2009. She also hosts and writes a Chicago-based hockey show that airs on Comcast SportsNet Chicago called Chicago Face-Off with April Rose that will run through eight episodes featuring a different Chicago Blackhawks player each week.

Modeling 
In 2012, she was listed as #82 in MAXIM’s definitive list of the world's most beautiful women the HOT 100 List In 2008, she won Maxim’s search for the hottest girl next door in America the MAXIM HomeTown Hottie contest.

Filmography

References

External links 
 
 
 
 

Living people
21st-century American actresses
Female models from Illinois
1987 births
Actresses from Chicago